Carrollton is a city in Carroll County, Missouri, United States. Carrollton won the 2005 All-America City Award, given out annually by the National Civic League. The population was 3,514 at the 2020 census. Carrollton is the county seat of Carroll County.

History

Carrollton was established in 1833.  It obtained its post office in 1834.  Carrollton's growth can be documented through Sanborn maps, several of which are available online.

The Carroll County Court House, Carroll County Sheriff's Quarters and Jail, United States Post Office, and Wilcoxson and Company Bank are listed on the National Register of Historic Places.

Geography
Carrollton is located in south central Carroll County at the intersection of US routes 24 and US Route 65. The Missouri River is five miles south of the city.

Climate

Demographics

Education
Carrollton R-VII School District operates Carrollton Area Career Center, Carrollton High School; grades 9-12, Carrollton Junior High School; grades 7–8, and Carrollton Elementary School; grades Pre-1 and 2–6.

The town has a lending library, the Carrollton Public Library.

Notable people
 Amanda Austin, painter and sculptor
 Leon E. Bates, UAW leader
 James Johnson Duderstadt, President of the University of Michigan. 1988-1996
 James Fergason, graduated Carrollton High School in 1952. American inventor and business entrepreneur.
 Francis Doyle Gleeson, Roman Catholic bishop
 Don Martin, defensive back for Yale
 John C. McQueen, Major general, USMC; Decorated veteran of World War II
 James Shields, Civil War general and United States Senator
 Robert Simpson was an American hurdler and track and field coach. 
 Claude T. Smith, American band conductor, composer, and educator.

References

External links
 Carrollton Area Chamber of Commerce
 Historic maps of Carrollton in the Sanborn Maps of Missouri Collection at the University of Missouri

Cities in Carroll County, Missouri
County seats in Missouri
Cities in Missouri